Sanjaasuren Oyun, also transcribed S. Oyun, is a Mongolian politician and geologist. She is the leader of the Civil Will Party, is the former Minister of Environment and Green Development, and has been a Member of Parliament of Mongolia (State Great Khural) since 1998. She is also a former Minister of Foreign Affairs and is the current head of the Zorig Foundation. Now she is new head of Global Water Partnership GWP. In 2003, Eisenhower Fellowships awarded Oyun a fellowship program in the United States. In 2006, Oyun was selected as a Young Global Leader (YGL) by the Davos World Economic Forum (WEF). She has been an active member of the YGL community since. On June 24, 2014, Oyun was elected the first president of the United Nations Environment Assembly (UNEA).

Early life and education
Oyun was born in Ulan-Bator in 1964. In 1987 she finished her studies in geochemistry at the Charles University of Prague. In 1996 she earned a PhD in geology from the Department of Earth Sciences at University of Cambridge.

Career
Upon graduating, Oyun began working for a multinational mining company called Rio Tinto.

After the murder of her brother S. Zorig, a Mongolian pro-democracy leader,  in October 1998, she entered politics. She won the by-elections in her brother's constituency in Dornod, the birthplace of their father Sanjaasuren. In March 2000, she founded the Civil Will Party. The Civil Will Party holds about ten percent of the public's support (as of the 2008 parliamentary elections). She also served as the Vice-Speaker of Parliament (between 2004 and 2005) and the Minister of Foreign Affairs (between 2007 and 2008).

She served as a Minister of Environment and Green Development of Mongolia. Since June 24, 2014, Oyun is working as the first president of the United Nations Environment Assembly (UNEA)

Besides Mongolian, Oyun speaks fluently in Russian, English, and Czech.

Other positions
 Zorig Foundation, Founder and Chair 
 Mongolian Geological Association, President 
 Down Syndrome Association of Mongolia, Chair
 Wellcome Trust, Member of the Strategic Advisory Board on Our Planet, Our Health

Family background
Oyun's mother, Dorjpalam, is famous for her role as a doctor in a well-known Mongolian movie Serelt. Dorjpalam's father was the Russian geographer and scientist Simukov, who fell victim to Mongolia's political purges of the 1930s. Oyun is married with three children.

Oyun's father, Sanjaasuren, served as the dean of the Philosophy Faculty of the National University of Mongolia and as Deputy Minister of Education.

References

External links

www.mongolei.de: Interview (in German)
Infosystem Mongolei: Oyuun, Sanjaasürängiïn (in German)
Иргэний Зориг Нам: Намын удирдлага (in Mongolian)

1964 births
Living people
Members of the State Great Khural
Mongolian geologists
People from Ulaanbaatar
Mongolian people of Russian descent
Democratic Party (Mongolia) politicians
Civil Will–Green Party politicians
21st-century Mongolian women politicians
21st-century Mongolian politicians
Female foreign ministers
20th-century Mongolian women politicians
20th-century Mongolian politicians
Women government ministers of Mongolia
Buryat people
Women geologists
20th-century geologists
Charles University alumni